David Henry (born February 24, 1975 in Denver, Colorado) is an American International Federation of BodyBuilders (IFBB) professional bodybuilder. Henry is a Master Sgt. (E-7) in the United States Air Force. He lives in Tucson, Arizona.

Career
At age 17, David started training with weight for his track & field events and competed his first bodybuilding competition, the Team Muscle Tech Challenge, where he won. His first National Physique Committee (NPC) competition was in the 2001 NPC Nationals, where he placed 11th in the middleweight division. His first IFBB competition was the Florida Pro Xtreme Challenge of 2004, where he placed 10th. His first Ironman Pro Invitational was in the same year, where he placed 6th. His first Arnold Classic was in 2005, where he placed 12th. He competed in his first Mr. Olympia later that year, where he placed 14th.

Stats
Height: 5'5"
Contest Weight: 203 lbs.
Off-Season Weight: 235 lbs.

Competitive history
2001 NPC Nationals, Middleweight, 11th
2002 NPC Nationals, Middleweight, 1st
2002 NPC USA Championships, Middleweight, 2nd
2004 Florida Pro Xtreme Challenge, 10th
2004 Ironman Pro Invitational, 6th
2004 San Francisco Pro Invitational, 8th
2005 Arnold Classic, 12th
2005 Europa Supershow, 4th
2005 Ironman Pro Invitational, 7th
2005 Mr. Olympia, 14th
2005 Mr. Olympia Wildcard Showdown, 1st
2005 San Francisco Pro Invitational, 7th
2005 Toronto Pro Invitational, 7th
2006 Arnold Classic, 11th
2006 Colorado Pro Championships, 3rd
2006 Ironman Pro Invitational, 2nd
2006 New York Pro Championships, 4th
2006 Mr. Olympia, 16th (tied)
2007 Arnold Classic, 14th
2007 Ironman Pro Invitational, 6th
2007 Mr. Olympia, 10th
2008 Ironman Pro Invitational, 12th
2008 Arnold Classic, 12th
2008 IFBB Tampa Bay Pro, 3rd
2008 Mr. Olympia, 15th, Men's 202 Division, 1st
2009 New York Pro 202 Division, 3rd
2009 Tampa Bay Pro 202 Division, 1st
2009 Mr. Olympia 202 Division, 2nd
2010 Europa Battle of Champions (Hartford,CT) 202 Division, 2nd
2012 DAPLACELLAS SUPER SHOW, 1st
2012 SHERU CLASSIC 212 1st
2013 SHERU CLASSIC 212 1st
2013 Mr. Olympia 212, 2nd
2014 Arnold Classic 212, 2nd

See also
Arnold Classic
List of male professional bodybuilders
Mr. Olympia

References 

1975 births
Living people
African-American bodybuilders
Professional bodybuilders
American bodybuilders
21st-century African-American sportspeople
20th-century African-American sportspeople